The Israeli Network is an international private television network. It launched September 2001 and features programming from all the top networks in Israel including Kan 11, Keshet 12, Reshet 13, Channel 10, Channel 8, Israeli Educational Television, Arutz HaYeladim, Hop! and Sports Channel.

The Israeli Network is available in North America; in the United States via Dish Network, Cablevision, Verizon FiOS & Comcast and in Canada via Rogers Cable & Bell Fibe TV through a partnership with Ethnic Channels Group.  It is also available in Europe and Africa through select providers and now in Caribbean Latin America Middle East Asia and the Pacific.

See also
 The Israeli Network Canada

External links 
The Israeli Network Official Site

Television channels in Israel
International broadcasters
Television channels and stations established in 2001